"Let's Go" is a song by will.i.am that features Chris Brown, which was part of the former's fourth studio album #willpower before being removed in November 2013. The reason for the song's removal was due to the unlicensed sampling of "Rebound" by Arty and Mat Zo. It was replaced with "Feelin' Myself" on the re-release.

Sampling controversy
The song heavily samples "Rebound" by Arty and Mat Zo. Arty made the claim via Twitter in April 2013 that Interscope Records had not asked for permission from Anjunabeats before will.i.am sampled "Rebound". Chris Brown stated in a tweet that he didn't know of the track's original source and claimed that he performed it due to a feature request. A statement was released by Anjunabeats that even though credit was given to Arty in the sleeve notes, doing so is not an appropriate way to obtain permission of clearing a sample, which was done following on from Arty's Twitter claim. Anjunabeats issued this statement in response to when will.i.am was quoted as telling the Associated Press in self-defence:

In a later interview for KIIS-FM, will.i.am went on to admit that he accidentally stole "Rebound" with the sample and was confused whether or not he had the right to use it for "Let's Go". The situation was elaborated on by will.i.am: "Arty is a dope producer so I wrote this song to 'Rebound' this last year. I got in touch with Arty and showed it to him, did a different version to it 'cause I asked him [to] make it newer 'cause I don't just wanna take your song and rap over it. But he said that after a year's time, "we preferred writing over and using the [original] rebound. Something happened and the clearance... hopefully we resolved the issue". The song was removed on the re-release of #willpower on November 26, 2013 and replaced as the fifth track on the album with "Feelin' Myself" after will.i.am contacted the owners of "Rebound" for negotiation. However, the audio was not deleted from will.i.am's Vevo account on YouTube.

In May 2013, Above & Beyond played "Rebound" at the Electric Daisy Carnival to make fun of will.i.am, and Mat Zo went on to do this too in June.

Charts

References

2013 songs
Chris Brown songs
Sampling controversies
Song recordings produced by will.i.am
Songs written by Chris Brown
Songs written by will.i.am
Will.i.am songs